Hybrid solar lighting (HSL) or hybrid lighting systems combine the use of solar with artificial light for interior illumination by channelling sunlight through fiber optic cable bundles to provide solar light into rooms without windows or skylights, and by supplementing this natural light with artificial light—typically LED—as required.
 
The bundles are led from exterior/rooftop optical light collectors through small openings or cable ducts and carry the light to where it is needed. The optical fibers end in hybrid luminaires where the sunlight is joined with electric light, either on demand or to automatically maintain a constant light level even as the available sunlight decreases.

Method of operation
Solar lighting systems capture light from the sun and conduct it towards a room using optical fibers. They use rooftop collectors, large mirrored dishes, that track the sun. The collectors adjust to aim the sunlight onto 127 optical fibers which are conducted into a single chord. The optical fibers are flexible and can be connected into hybrid light fixtures that are joined to diffusing rods that disperse the light. A single collector can power up to eight hybrid light fixtures covering .

The hybrid lights also use artificial lighting which is mixed with the natural sunlight beamed in down the fiber optic chord. Photosensors focus on how much light needs to be generated to add to the natural light in order to keep a room illuminated at a constant brightness. When the sun is blocked by clouds around five percent of its sunlight requirement will need to be added. Hybrid solar lighting systems should be used in rooms with direct roof access.

Cost of hybrid solar lighting systems

The price of each hybrid solar lighting system requires to be installed with each watt of light bulb used. It is about $5–$8 per watt.

See also
Solar energy
Renewable energy
Photovoltaics
Sustainable energy
Light tube

References

External links
Hybrid Solar Lighting – the Future of Solar Lights

Solar thermal energy
Energy conversion
Lighting